Gökçek Park is a public park in Ankara, Turkey. Gökçek Park is in Keçiören which is district of Ankara. It is named after Melih Gökçek, the mayor of Ankara Metropolitan Municipality.

References

External links

Parks in Ankara
Keçiören
Urban public parks